Noti may refer to:
 Noti, Oregon, a settlement in the US
 Notia, a village in Greece
 NotI, an enzyme
 Károly Nóti (1892–1954), Hungarian screenwriter

See also 
 Notti (disambiguation)